M. Amjad Hossain (born 1953) is an orthopedic surgeon and a fighter during the Bangladesh Liberation War. He was awarded the Independence Award (Swadhinata Padak) in 2021. He is known nationally and internationally for his works.

Participation at Liberation war 
Amjad took part in the Bangladesh Liberation War in 1971. During the war, he sustained an injury on his femur and underwent treatment at Indian military hospitals.

References 

Recipients of the Independence Day Award
Living people
1953 births